Al-Ubeidiya is a Palestinian town located  east of Bethlehem. The town is a part of the Bethlehem Governorate in the central West Bank. According to the Palestinian Central Bureau of Statistics (PCBS), al-Ubeidiya had a population of over 14,967 in 2019.

The Monastery of St. Theodosius, the Mar Saba Monastery and the 'Ayn Fashkhah tourist area are all on Al-Ubeidiya land.

Name
In 1881, Palmer called the place Kh. Deir Ibn Obeid, meaning "The ruin of the monastery of the son of Obeid; also called Mar Theodosius.

According to the Applied Research Institute–Jerusalem (ARIJ), Al-Ubeidiya is named after a certain Al-‘Ubeidi Faris of the Shammar tribe, who came to the area from the Arabian Peninsula.

History and archaeology

Background: Roman and Byzantine periods
A Roman period pool, built in order to collect water, is situated in the center of al-Ubeidiya.

Two Greek Orthodox monasteries were first established during the Byzantine period in the late fifth century, and are now standing within the municipal jurisdiction of Ubeidiya. The Monastery of St. Theodosius, known in Arabic as Deir Ibn 'Ubeid (lit. 'Monastery of the Son of 'Ubeid') or as Mar Dosi ('Saint Theodosius'), named after its founder; and Mar Saba Monastery, or simply Mar Saba, founded and named after Saint Sabbas ('Mar Saba').

Ottoman period: Ubeidiya
The area, like the rest of Palestine, was incorporated into the Ottoman Empire in 1517. In 1596 Al-Ubeidiya appeared in Ottoman tax registers, called Dayr Bani 'Ubayd (lit. 'Monastery of the 'Ubayd clan'), being in the nahiya of Al-Quds (Jerusalem) in the liwa of Al-Quds. It had a population of 42 households and 6 bachelors, all Muslim. They paid a fixed tax-rate of 33,3 % on agricultural products, including wheat, barley, occasional revenues, goats and/or beehives; a total of 4,900 akçe.

Around 1740 Richard Pococke noted "We soon came to a ruin called Der Benalbede, which from the name seems to have been an old convent."

In 1838, Edward Robinson noted Deir ibn Obeid, not far from Mar Saba, on his travels in the region. He also met some of the fellahin from the village by the Dead Sea, where they collected salt for cooking.

In 1863, the French explorer Victor Guérin visited the place, which he called Deir Dosi, and described the remains of the monastery. In 1883, the PEF's "Survey of Western Palestine" described there Kh. Deir Ibn Obeid as "Ruins of a modern village", but in 1899 Conrad Schick noted that "This [...] designation is not sufficient -the ruins are not those of a village, but of a former convent, and only in modern times used as a storehouse for grain by the wandering tribe Ubedieh." Schick notes that the "Badawin" (Bedouin) of the Ubedieh call the convent ruins by the name of their own tribe, and have a nearby maqam by the name of Sheikh Khalife where they worship.

Schick notes that in 1897, the Greek Orthodox Church had recovered the ruins of the former convent of Saint Theodosius from the Bedouin, and by the following year had started with their project of erecting a new monastery there. The current compound was built mainly between 1914-1952.

British Mandate
In the 1922 census of Palestine, conducted by the British Mandate authorities, the tribal area of Ibaidiyeh had an all-Muslim population of 2,000, 880 males and 1,120 females. In the 1931 census the El Ubeidiya consisted of 1,187 persons, still all Muslim, 610 males and 577 females.

In the 1945 statistics, the population was counted under the name of tribal unit (arab) as Arab Ibn Ubeid, along with three other such units, Arab et Ta'amira, Arab et Rashayida and Arab et Sawahira; together they had a population of 7,070 Muslims, where Arab Ibn Ubeid had a total of 92,026 dunams of land, according to an official land and population survey. Of this, 3,732 dunams were used for cereals, while 88,294 dunams were classified as non-cultitivable land.

Jordanian period
In the wake of the 1948 Arab–Israeli War, and after the 1949 Armistice Agreements, Al-Ubeidiya came under Jordanian rule. 

In 1961, the population of 'Ubeidiya was of 838.

1967, aftermath
Since the Six-Day War in 1967, al-Ubeidiya has been under Israeli occupation. The population in the 1967 census conducted by the Israeli authorities was 1,377.

After the 1995 Oslo Accords, 9.1% of village land was classified as Area A, 0.4% as Area B, and the remainder 82% as Area C. Israel has confiscated land from Al-Ubeidiya in order to construct at least 2 Israeli settlements; 124 dunams for the settlement
of Ovnat and 97 dunams for the nature reserve of ‘Ayn Fashkhah, both on the Dead Sea shore.

Current state

Administration
Since 1997, al-Ubeidiya has been governed by an 11-member municipal council appointed by the Palestinian National Authority (PNA). The municipality has jurisdiction over 97,232 dunams of land—much larger than the built-up and residential areas of the town which constitute 979 of those dunams. Other localities located within the municipal borders include Wadi al-Arayis.

Religion
The population is Muslim, except for the monasteries, which are inhabited by Greek Orthodox monks. and there are ten mosques in the town.

Population structure (tribe, clans)
The residents are mostly descendants of the Shammar with the main families being al-'Asa, al-Radayda, al-Rabai'a, al-Hasasna, and Abu Sirhan.

Landmarks

Monastery of St. Theodosius
The Greek Orthodox Monastery of St. Theodosius stands on a hilltop on the road to Mar Saba, some 6 km from the eastern outskirts of Bethlehem. The once large fortified Byzantine monastery, which holds the tomb of its founder, Saint Theodosius the Cenobiarch (c. 423–529), has been rebuilt on a much smaller scale. Most of the current compound was erected between 1914-1952, incorporates Byzantine remains, and is centered on a small grotto, the "Cave of the Magi", where tradition has the three Magi stopping on their way home after having delivered gifts to the newborn Baby Jesus.

Mar Saba Monastery
The Mar Saba Monastery was founded by Saint Sabbas the Sanctified (439–532) and is located east of the town proper. The strongly fortified monastery, established in 484 and expanded over the centuries, stands on the west bank of Wadi en-Nar.

References

Bibliography
  

   

  

 
  

 
  (Marti and Schick, 1880, pp. 34-37)
  
  
 
  (pp.   271-278)

External links
Survey of Western Palestine, Map 17:    IAA, Wikimedia commons
Al-‘Ubeidiya Town (Fact Sheet),  Applied Research Institute–Jerusalem (ARIJ)
Al ‘Ubeidiya Town Profile, ARIJ
Al-‘Ubeidiya Aerial Photo, ARIJ
The priorities and needs for development in Al ‘Ubeidiya town based on the community and local authorities’ assessment, ARIJ

Towns in the West Bank
Municipalities of the State of Palestine
Populated places in the Bethlehem Governorate